Steel breastplate, or Stalnoi Nagrudnik is a type of body armor similar to a cuirass developed by the Red Army in World War II. The native Cyrillic abbreviation for the vest was "СН", the Cyrillic letters Es and En. It consisted of two pressed steel plates that protected the front torso and groin.  The plates were 2 mm (.08") and weighed 3.5 kg (7.7 lbs).  This armor was supplied to SHISBr (assault engineers).

Models
Several models were created; the number indicates the year of development:

 SN-38
 SN-39
 SN-40, SN-40A
 SN-42, made of 2 mm steel 36SGN, the tolerances 1.8 - 2.2 mm, weight of Chest 3.3 - 3.5 kg. It protected an area measuring 0.2 square meters.
 SN-46

The steel breastplates along with the conventional steel SSh-40 helmets equipped the assault engineers and demining brigades of the Supreme Command Reserve Stavka, for which they are sometimes called "tubular infantry." Breastplate SN-42 was designed to protect against bayonet attacks, small fragments of shrapnel, and 9mm pistol bullets with lead cores, providing protection against fire from an MP-38/40 submachine gun from distances of 100–150m, and a single shot from a 7.92×57mm Mauser rifle (like the Gewehr 41), but on the condition that the bullet went on a tangent. Following the adoption of the Wehrmacht on the supply of 9mm cartridges, the cartridge code R.08 mE (German: mit Eisenkern), with a bullet with mild steel (iron) core, required the thickness to be increased to 2.6 mm for the chest plate (2.5 - 2.7 mm). This redesign received the name SN-46.

By modern standards, they are roughly equivalent to a Class II vest.

  USSR - steel breastplates SN-42 began to arrive in the army in 1942 and were later used during World War II.
  Poland - Soviet steel cuirass entered service of the 1st Polish Army (as of October 31, 1944 there were 1000 pieces).
  The Third Reich - by some accounts, captured Soviet steel breastplates came to supply the German army; also Germany, in limited quantities (only for parts of the SS, mostly assault squads), produced similar breastplates.

Estimates of the plates' performance from front-line soldiers were mixed, receiving both positive and negative feedback. The vest worked well in street fighting and other types of close quarter combat. However, in the field where assault teams often had to crawl the breastplates were just an unnecessary burden.

Similar design

 Steel cuirass were mass-produced and were used during the First World War by the armies of Germany (Sappenpanzer), Britain, France, and Italy where they were known as Corazze Farina from the name of the designer. 
 In the 1920s-1930s steel cuirasses were in service with the Polish police.
 In the 1920s-1930s  several types of steel cuirasses were developed for the soldiers of the Imperial Japanese Army, and were used during fighting in China.

Literature

 Bashford Dean: Helmets and Body Armor in Modern Warfare, Verlag READ BOOKS, 2008, S. 162–163,

See also

 Body armor
 Ballistic vest
 Body armor#Performance standards
 List of personal protective equipment by body area

References

Body armor
World War II military equipment of the Soviet Union
Military equipment of the Soviet Union
Arsenal Plant (Saint Petersburg) products